MasterChef Indonesia is an Indonesian competitive cooking reality show based on the original British series of the same name, open to amateur and home chefs. Produced by Endemol Shine Group, it debuted on 1 May 2011 on RCTI and has ten seasons to date.

Format 

MasterChef Indonesia airs two days a week from Saturday to Sunday. The competition takes place in the RCTI's studio in Kebon Jeruk, West Jakarta which is known as MasterChef Gallery and includes a large kitchen area with several cooking stations which is overlooked by a balcony, a well-stocked pantry, and a freezer.

At the audition round, the contestants have to prepare their mainstay dish for around 30 minutes. The judges can advance them to the next round based on their dishes by deciding to give them an apron or not.

In the bootcamp round, the first challenge is to have the contestants perform basic skills such as filleting a fish, peeling shrimp, etc. During that time, the judges will observe their techniques. The second challenge requires the contestants to create a dish using a prepared staple ingredient. The judges can advance them to the gallery round or eliminate them, taking their aprons, based on their cooking techniques and the taste of their dishes.

Subsequently, the formal competition typically begins following a three event cycle that takes place over two episodes, where the judges will eliminate one or even two contestants after the third event. The events typically are:
 Mystery Box: Contestants are all given a box with the same ingredients and must use only those ingredients to create a dish within a fixed amount of time. The judges will select 3 dishes based on visual appearance and technique alone to taste, and from these 3 select one winner who will gain an advantage to prevent the pressure test and advance to the next round automatically.
 Elimination Test: The judges explain to the mystery box winner the theme of the elimination test (or sometimes take the winner to the pantry) and tell of at least one advantage. The typical example of this is selecting the specific ingredient to use or dish to recreate, but can also include automatic advancement to the next round, assigning certain ingredients to specific chefs or saving one of the contestants. The rest of the contestants are then informed and collected any ingredients that has been prepared for this test with a fixed amount of time to complete the dish. Judges evaluate all dishes based on taste and visual appeal. One from the contestants with a best dish will go straight to the next round and then the judges will nominate some of the contestants with a worst dish and critique their dishes before telling them to get ready for the pressure test.
 Pressure Test: The worst performing contestants must compete against each other to make a standard dish within a very limited amount of time that requires a great degree of cooking finesse. For those contestants who pass to the next round will watch the test from the balcony. Each dish is judged on the taste, visual appeal and technique, and the losing contestant is eliminated.
 Signature Dish: Contestants are tasked with creating a dish that represented themselves and their cooking philosophy around a staple ingredient or theme.
 Duplication Test: Contestants are required to duplicate a certain dish in terms of presentation and taste.
 Skills Test: The judges explain the preparation of a specific dish, or the preparation of an ingredient. The contestant is then required to reproduce that dish in a specific time limit – typically 15–20 minutes. The judges then look the contestant's attempt and give feedback. The judges give a 1-minute penalty to a contestant who cannot prepare the ingredient or cook the dish properly before continuing the next step.
 Offsite Challenge: Challenges that must be done outside the MasterChef gallery.

Seasons overview 

Note:

Winner and Runner-up's statistics

Winner

Runner-up 

Notes:

Seasons synopsis

Season 1 (2011)
This inaugural season premiered on 1 May 2011. The judges for this season were Juna Rorimpandey, Rinrin Marinka, and Vindex Tengker. There were 20 finalists competing for the title.

On 8 May 2011, Dudi withdrew from the competition due to his deteriorating health condition.

The first Indonesian MasterChef winner was Lucky Andreono, a 31-year-old furniture entrepreneur, with Agus Sasirangan, a 25-year-old teacher, being the runner-up.

Top 20

Season 2 (2012) 
The second season premiered on 21 August 2012. This season, Juna Rorimpandey and Rinrin Marinka returned as judges, while Vindex Tengker was replaced by Degan Septoadji.

There were 20 original finalists competing this season. Adeline withdrew from the competition on 29 July 2012.

The winner was Desi Trisnawati, a 39-year-old hotel director from Bangka. Taufik Hidayat, a 30-year-old property agent, was the runner-up.

Top 20

Season 3 (2013) 

The third season premiered on 5 May 2013. This season, judges Rinrin Marinka and Degan Septoadji returned from the previous season with a new addition to the judge, Arnold Poernomo, replacing Juna Rorimpandey. The number of finalists was 25 contestants, up from the previous 20 contestants.

The winner of this season was William Gozali, a 22-year-old store supervisor, with Febrian Wicaksono, a 25-year-old private employee, as the runner-up.

Top 25

Season 4 (2015) 

The fourth season premiered on 31 May 2015. The number of finalists was 30 contestants, up from the previous 25 contestants. There were only two judges this season. Arnold Poernomo returned, with new judge Matteo Guerinoni joining him, replacing both Rinrin Marinka and Degan Septoadji.

On 25 July 2015, Budi A. M. withdrew from the competition due to a long-term stomach problem that caused him to be unable to finish his cooking in the elimination test.

The winner of this season was Luvita Hodiono, a 20-year-old college student, making her the youngest winner in the history of MasterChef Indonesia. She defeated Deny Gumilang, a 35-year-old entrepreneur.

Top 30

Season 5 (2019)

After a four-year hiatus, MasterChef Indonesia confirmed on 27 September 2018, in its official Instagram, that the series had been renewed for the fifth season. This season premiered on 3 March 2019 with Juna Rorimpandey and Arnold Poernomo returning as judges, and a new addition to the judge Renatta Moeloek replacing Matteo Guerinoni. The number of finalists decreased from the previous 30 to 26 contestants.

Fani Horison from Sampit was announced as the winner, with Kai Firdayassie as the runner-up.

Top 26

Season 6 (2019–20)
The sixth season premiered on 21 December 2019 with Juna Rorimpandey, Arnold Poernomo, and Renatta Moeloek returning as judges. The number of finalists increased to 28 contestants from the previous 26 contestants.

On 11 January 2020, Eddy Siswanto was disqualified from the competition because he was found cheating by carrying a recipe note while making a dessert in a Safe and Risk challenge.

On 25 January 2020, Arthur Tamnge withdrew from the competition because he had to tend to his pregnant wife although he had passed the pressure test.

At the end of the season, Eric Herjanto was declared the winner, with Firhan Ashari as the runner-up.

Top 28

Season 7 (2020) 

The seventh season premiered on 26 September 2020 with all three previous judges returning. The number of contestants decreased from 28 to 20.

Since this season was filmed during the COVID-19 pandemic, practice of social distancing, wearing a cooking mask and gloves while handling ingredients were required. For the first time in history, a mother and son (Yuli and Hamdzah) competed together in the gallery.

The winner was 24-year-old entrepreneur Jerry Andrean, who was eliminated on 31 October and returned on 7 November, making him the first former Black Team member to win the competition. The runner-up was 23-year-old cook helper, Audrey Wicaksono.

Top 20

Season 8 (2021) 

The first episode of the 8th season aired on 29 May 2021. All three previous judges returned in this season. The number of contestants decreased from 20 to 18.

Although Olivia was given a second chance to be back in the competition as a Black Team member, she decided to withdraw as she felt overwhelmed by the competition.

The winner was Jesselyn Lauwreen from Medan, making her the second Sumatran to win the title. Nadya Puteri from Jakarta was the runner-up.

Top 18

Season 9 (2022) 

MasterChef Indonesia Season 9 has aired since 22 January 2022, with all three judges returning. The number of finalists increased from the previous 18 to 22 contestants.

This season introduces a new format during the audition round. If all three of the judges give a "yes" to a contestant, that contestant will wear a white apron and automatically proceed to the Gallery. However, if only two out of the three judges give a "yes", then the contestant will have to wear a gray apron and go to the Bootcamp round before the gallery.

The winner of this season was 24-year-old Cheryl Puteri Gunawan, with Palitho Aventus Simanjuntak as the runner-up.

Top 22

Season 10 (2022-2023)
The 10th season premiered on 24 December 2022 with all 3 returning judges. The number of contestants increased from 22 to 24.

Top 24

Awards and nominations

Notes

References

External links